Cychropsis schmidti is a species of ground beetle in the subfamily of Carabinae. It was described by Heinz in 1994.

References

schmidti
Beetles described in 1994